Wesley Gomes de Oliveira (born 15 January 1972) is a Brazilian former footballer and manager.

Career

Gomes de Oliveira started his career with Persebaya U-21.

References

1962 births
Living people
Association football midfielders
Brazilian expatriate sportspeople in Indonesia
Brazilian expatriate footballers
Brazilian footballers
Brazilian football managers
Expatriate football managers in Indonesia
Indonesia Super League managers
Reserve
Perseru Serui managers
Persiwa Wamena managers
Persebaya Surabaya players